Tone Dahle (born 10 August 1945) is a Norwegian cross-country skier from Oslo. She competed in 5 km at the 1968 Winter Olympics in Grenoble, where she placed 28th.

Cross-country skiing results

Olympic Games

World Championships

References

External links

1945 births
Living people
Skiers from Oslo
Norwegian female cross-country skiers
Olympic cross-country skiers of Norway
Cross-country skiers at the 1968 Winter Olympics